Sławomir Chałaśkiewicz (born 29 November 1963) is a retired Polish footballer who played as a midfielder. Besides Poland, he has played in Germany.

References

External links
 

1963 births
Living people
Footballers from Łódź
Association football midfielders
Polish footballers
Widzew Łódź players
Śląsk Wrocław players
FC Hansa Rostock players
FC Carl Zeiss Jena players
KSV Hessen Kassel players
SV Babelsberg 03 players
Bundesliga players
2. Bundesliga players